Angelo Torres (born April 14, 1932, in Santurce, Puerto Rico) is an American cartoonist and caricaturist whose work has appeared in many noteworthy comic books, as well as a long-running regular illustrator for Mad.

EC Comics
Torres was friends with artist Al Williamson in the early 1950s and occasionally assisted him on work for EC Comics with fellow artists Frank Frazetta and Roy Krenkel (known as the Fleagle Gang). The story which was to be Torres' first solo EC story, "An Eye for an Eye" in Incredible Science Fiction #33 (Jan.-Feb. 1956), was rejected by the Comics Code and did not see print for the first time until 1971.

Atlas Comics
When the EC comics line ended after the enforcement of the Comics Code, Torres (and several other EC alumni) went to Atlas Comics (later to be known as the Marvel Comics Group) and drew a number of short stories for their mystery titles in 1956-57, titles such as Astonishing, Spellbound, Uncanny Tales, Marvel Tales and many others.

Warren Publishing
Torres later worked for Warren Publishing under editor Archie Goodwin. He contributed art on 20 stories for Creepy, Eerie and Blazing Combat from 1964 through 1967.

Mad Magazine
From October 1969 until April 2005 he drew the satires of contemporary U.S. television shows (and later movies) as the penultimate feature in Mad magazine (whereas Mort Drucker drew the movie parodies in its opening portions).

He was named #61 in Atomic Comics' (retailer) list of The Top 100 Artists of American Comic Books.

Recent work 
Torres illustrated many new "what if?" covers for comic historian Grant Geissman's acclaimed books which answer the question, "What if EC hadn't abandoned their line of comics, and Angelo had been asked by Bill Gaines to tackle some cover assignments. He also drew more than 40 new original cover illustrations on the intentionally blank PANIC Comics #6 Russ Cochran reprints which debuted weekly with the heading #TorresTuesday on social media as a diversion for his fans with the outbreak of the COVID-19 pandemic.

Society of Illustrators Museum of Illustration Exhibition
For his 90th birthday, The Society of Illustrators in New York City fêted Torres with a comprehensive exhibition of his vast body of work: "What, Me PANIC? Celebrating Angelo Torres" from May 11 through September 3, 2022 with several hundred never-before-seen pieces of original art from his tenure with EC, Marvel, Warren, MAD and more, photos, comics, magazines and memorabilia. Robert L. Reiner curated the show with assistance from Clint Morgan, who also designed the exhibition program (https://societyillustrators.org/shop/books-media/si-publications/signed-what-me-panic-celebrating-angelo-torres-exhibition-catalog), and the filmmakers Ian Scott McGregor and Will Mayo produced a short documentary - My Dinner with Angelo - interviewing and revisiting the career of Angelo Torres (https://www.youtube.com/watch?v=eycPHlNU_48)

The Unwanted by Otto Binder
Angelo Torres provided layouts and pencils for a "new work" by the late Otto Binder (1911-1974). Adapted by Robert L. Reiner, the story was written in 1953 and was previously unpublished. Stefan Koidl, a Salzburg-based sculptor and master digital artist provided finishing art. Titled, "The Unwanted," the story is a parable where a society learns to be careful what it wishes for and to understand what it means to be unwanted. Fantagraphics is the publisher.

Bibliography 

Comics work includes:
Piracy #1-2 (inks, EC Comics, Oct/Nov 1954)
Creepy #1-5, 7, 10-13 (Warren Publishing, 1964–1966)
Eerie #2,3,5,6,8 (Warren Publishing, 1965–1966)
Mad #130-213, 288, 300 (October 1968-March 1980, December 1988, January 1991)
Horror From The Tomb 1954

References

Sources

Lambiek: Angelo Torres

External links
Complete list of Torres' work for Mad
Angelo Torres at Comic Vine

American caricaturists
American comics artists
American parodists
1932 births
Living people
Mad (magazine) cartoonists
EC Comics
People from Santurce, Puerto Rico
Puerto Rican cartoonists